The Labour and Trade Union Group was an organisation for supporters of the Militant tendency in Northern Ireland.

The group originated in the Northern Ireland Labour Party (NILP), but developed a separate existence as that organisation declined in support, and was expelled from the NILP in 1977.  It was initially named the "Labour and Trade Union Coordinating Committee", and aimed to include other left-wingers.  It campaigned for a Conference of Labour, at which trade unions, socialist groups and community campaigns could agree on a coordinated approach to labour movement politics, but no such conference was ever held.

The group failed to win any support and was largely considered a fringe party. It stood Muriel Tang in the 1983 United Kingdom general election in Belfast East, where she took 1.5% of the vote.  It then stood three candidates for Belfast City Council at the 1985 Northern Ireland local elections, none of whom were elected.  At the 1992 general election, it stood two candidates, including leader Peter Hadden, who took 1,264 votes between them.  By 1993, it was part of Militant Labour. It joined the short-lived Labour coalition in 1996.

References

1972 establishments in Northern Ireland
1996 disestablishments in Northern Ireland
Committee for a Workers' International
Communist parties in Ireland
Communist parties in Northern Ireland
Defunct political parties in Northern Ireland
Labour parties in Ireland
Labour parties in Northern Ireland
Northern Ireland Labour Party
Political parties disestablished in 1996
Political parties established in 1972
Trotskyist organisations in Ireland
Trotskyist organisations in Northern Ireland